Esquivel is a surname of Basque origin. Esquivel may also refer to:

Locations
Esquíbel or Esquivel (officially Eskibel) a Basque town located in Vitoria-Gasteiz, Spain
Port Esquivel, Jamaica
Caye Esquivel, Cuban caye
Esquivel, Alcalá del Río, a town located in the municipality of Alcalá del Río, Sevilla, Spain
Apo Esquivel Pob., a town located in Jaen, Nueva Ecija, Philippines
Essequibo (colony), a Dutch colony on the Essequibo River (named after Juan de Esquivel) in the Guiana region from 1616 to 1814

Buildings and monuments
Eskibel Castle, a castle located in Vitoria-Gasteiz, Spain
Palacio Escoriaza-Esquivel, a palace located in Vitoria-Gasteiz, Spain
Casa de Esquivel y Jaraba, Peruvian royal house
Corral de Esquivel, 19th century building located in Sevilla, Spain

Physical locations
Cerro Esquivel, a mountain located near Acarí, Peru
Essequibo River, the largest river in Guyana, named after Juan de Esquivel

People
Juan García Esquivel, Mexican composer of space age pop, used sole name Esquivel